St. Hedwig's Cathedral is a Catholic church on Bebelplatz in the historic centre of Berlin. Dedicated to Hedwig of Silesia, it was erected from 1747 to 1887 by order of Frederick the Great according to plans by Georg Wenzeslaus von Knobelsdorff in Baroque style. Damaged during the Allied bombing in World War II, the cathedral of the Archdiocese of Berlin was restored from 1952 to 1963 in post-war modernist style as part of the Forum Fridericianum. Since 2018, the listed building has been closed for renovation.

History and architecture 

St. Hedwig's Church was built in the 18th century following a request from local parishioners to King Frederick II. He donated the land on which the church was built. The church was dedicated to the patron of Silesia and Brandenburg, Saint Hedwig of Andechs. 
It was the first Catholic church built in Prussia after the Reformation.  The building was designed by Georg Wenzeslaus von Knobelsdorff and modelled after the Pantheon in Rome. 
Construction started in 1747, but was interrupted and delayed several times by economic problems. It was not opened until 1 November 1773, when the king's friend, Ignacy Krasicki, the Bishop of Warmia (later Archbishop of Gniezno), officiated at the cathedral's consecration .

After the Kristallnacht pogroms that took place on the night of 9–10 November 1938, Bernhard Lichtenberg, a canon of the cathedral chapter of St. Hedwig since 1931, prayed publicly for Jews at evening prayer. Lichtenberg was later jailed by the Nazis and died on the way to the concentration camp at Dachau. 
In 1965, Blessed Bernhard Lichtenberg's remains were transferred to the crypt at St. Hedwig's Cathedral.

The cathedral was severely damaged by Allied bombing in an air raid on 1 March 1943. Only the damaged shell of the building was left standing. Reconstruction started in 1952 and on 1 November 1963, All Saints' Day, the new high altar was consecrated by the Bishop of Berlin, Alfred Cardinal Bengsch.

Between 1949 and 1990, St. Hedwig's was in East Berlin, under the control of the East German government.

The cathedral closed for major renovations on 1 September 2018. The relics of Bl. Bernhard Lichtenberg have been transferred to the crypt of Maria Regina Martyrum during the time of the cathedral's renovation.

Tapestries 
Fitting to the character of the liturgical season, a huge tapestry is hanging behind the cathedra. The cathedral owns three of them; all three share the motif of the heavenly Jerusalem.

The tapestry of former Bauhaus student Margaretha Reichardt (Grete Reichardt) (1907–1984) of Erfurt was handwoven in 1963. It depicts a stylised city with the names of the apostles inscribed on foundation stones. God is represented by the Tree of Life and a lamb features as a symbol of Christ. (1891–1965) made a colorful appliqué work. It is a geometric composition using themes from the Book of Revelation. This also uses themes from Revelations.

Burials in the crypt 
Konrad von Preysing
Alfred Bengsch  
Bernhard Lichtenberg 
Georg Sterzinsky

Gallery

See also
Religion in Berlin

References

External links 

 Website of the cathedral, includes mass schedule

Roman Catholic cathedrals in Germany
Basilica churches in Germany
Hedwig's Cathedral
Hedwig
Tapestries
18th-century Roman Catholic church buildings in Germany
Hedwig
Rebuilt buildings and structures in Berlin
Roman Catholic churches completed in 1773
Roman Catholic churches completed in 1963
Berlin Hedwig